Sasha Behar (born 25 September 1971) is an English actress, known for portraying the role of Maya Sharma in the ITV soap opera Coronation Street.

Career
Behar portrayed the character of villain Maya Sharma in the ITV soap opera Coronation Street from 2003 to 2004. The role won her the Best Villain award at the 2005 British Soap Awards. Her other television credits include Holby City, Hercule Poirot's Christmas, Messiah and Lewis. She also guest starred in the Doctor Who episode "The Fires of Pompeii", playing Spurrina and played Dr Mortimer in Sherlock (2012). Her theatre credits include The Bitter Tears of Petra von Kant and The Island Princess, Eastward Ho and The Malcontent, with the Royal Shakespeare Company.

Personal life 
Behar has two daughters Edie and Ava with her partner, actor Jamie Glover. They currently live in Brixton, south London.

Filmography

References

External links
 

1971 births
20th-century English actresses
21st-century English actresses
English soap opera actresses
English television actresses
English film actresses
English stage actresses
Royal Shakespeare Company members
British Shakespearean actresses
Living people
People from Brixton